André Tota (born 9 December 1950) is a former French footballer who played as a striker. He was born to Polish parents.

Personal life
He is the father of French singer Matt Pokora and Julien with Brigitte Tota.

References

 Col., Football 79, Les Cahiers de l'Équipe, 1978, cf. page 102.

External links
 
  

1950 births
Living people
People from Briey
French people of Polish descent
Sportspeople from Meurthe-et-Moselle
Association football forwards
French footballers
FC Girondins de Bordeaux players
Toulouse FC players
FC Metz players
ES Troyes AC players
Footballers from Grand Est